Poshtkuh Rural District is a rural district (dehestan) in Poshtkuh District, Khash County, Sistan and Baluchestan province, Iran. At the 2006 census, its population, including portions split off to form Bilari Rural District, was 13,612, in 2,469 families. The rural district has 53 villages. At the 2016 census, its population was 5,933.

References 

Khash County
Rural Districts of Sistan and Baluchestan Province
Populated places in Khash County